Christopher Hiley Ludlow Bathurst, 3rd Viscount Bledisloe, QC (24 June 1934 – 12 May 2009), was a British barrister and politician.

Bledisloe was the son of Benjamin Bathurst, 2nd Viscount Bledisloe. He was educated at Eton – having won a scholarship from Ludgrove – and Trinity College, Oxford, but left the latter after a year. He served in the army as a Second Lieutenant of the 11th Hussars from 1954 to 1955 and was called to the Bar at Gray's Inn in 1959, after placing fourth out of 500 candidates in the Bar exams. In 1978 he became a Queen's Counsel (QC).

He was one of the ninety hereditary peers elected by the other hereditary peers to take a seat in the House of Lords, which most hereditary peers lost by the House of Lords Act 1999. The Bledisloe seat is Lydney Park, Gloucestershire, from which the territorial designation of the peerage was taken. He sat as a crossbencher.

Bledisloe married Elizabeth Mary Thompson in 1962. They had two sons and one daughter and divorced in 1986. His elder son and successor, Rupert Bathurst, 4th Viscount Bledisloe, is a noted portrait artist. Bledisloe died on 12 May 2009.

Bledisloe was the President of the St. Moritz Tobogganing Club (SMTC), also known as the Cresta.

References

External links

Viscount Bledisloe – Daily Telegraph obituary
 
 http://www.thepeerage.com/p14421.htm#i144207

1934 births
2009 deaths
Viscounts in the Peerage of the United Kingdom
Alumni of Trinity College, Oxford
People educated at Eton College
English King's Counsel
11th Hussars officers
20th-century King's Counsel
Members of Gray's Inn
Christopher
21st-century King's Counsel
People educated at Ludgrove School
English barristers

Hereditary peers elected under the House of Lords Act 1999